Gładysz or Gladysz is a surname. Notable people with the surname include:

 John A. Gladysz (born 1952), American chemist
 Józef Gładysz (born 1952), Polish football coach

See also
 

Polish-language surnames